Arbat-e Sofla (also Romanized as Arbaţ-e Soflá) is a village in Ajorluy-ye Sharqi Rural District, Baruq District, Miandoab County, West Azerbaijan Province, Iran. At the 2006 census, its population was 188, in 37 families.

References 

Populated places in Miandoab County